Postel 2000 FC is a football (soccer) club from Chad based in N'Djamena. The club was national ligue champion 2 times, in 1993 and 1995.

Achievements
Chad Premier League : 2
 1993, 1995.

Chad Cup: 1
 1991.

Coupe de Ligue de N'Djaména: 0
 Runners-up: 2009.

Chad Super Cup: 0

Performance in CAF competitions
African Cup of Champions Clubs: 2 appearances
1994 – Preliminary Round
1996 – First Round

CAF Cup Winners' Cup: 1 appearance
 1992 – Preliminary Round

Managers

  Emmanuel Boukar

References

Football clubs in Chad
1985 establishments in Chad